Best Revenge was a queercore punk band from Los Angeles. They were active as a studio and live act from the beginning of 1998 until December 2002.

History

Best Revenge was formed by members Ryan Revenge (vocals/guitar) and KT (bass/vocals) in early 1998.  The two were previously in a band called Happybomb while attending college at the University of Southern California. Revenge pitched to KT his idea of putting together a melodic punk rock band with queer-oriented lyrics, playing her a few songs he'd been working on including one that would later become one of the band's anthems, "Punk Rock Fag."

While searching for a rehearsal space and a drummer, the two found both when they answered an ad to rent a garage space in Venice Beach, CA.  The garage space was coincidentally at the former home of Jordan Crane, and the current occupant of the house was Bilito Peligro, who later joined the band on drums.

The gathering scene created the need for a record label to document the music that would probably never find a place in the major label mainstream.  Peligro and Revenge responded by starting up Spitshine Records, which went on to put out all of Best Revenge's releases as well as releases by local acts IAMLOVED, $3 Puta, Brian Grillo (of Extra Fancy and Lock Up), Hot-N-Heavy, the Sharpease and a Freak Show compilation CD.

Post-Best Revenge
After Best Revenge, Ryan Revenge played with the bands Exit Plan and Terrazzo.  In June 2012, he completed his doctoral work in Political Science, earning a Ph.D. from the University of California, Davis.  He is currently employed as an assistant professor at Bradley University. Bilito Peligro and Frisky McNichol played with the Gay-Gays, the all-gay Go-Go's tribute band. Bilito has continued playing drums for Los Angeles bands Miata, Temperamentals, and Local Channel (LCL CHNNL).  KT skates as Trixie Biscuit on a banked track roller derby team called Fight Crew, and performs as a stunt woman in film and television.

The Best Revenge song, "Know You", was featured in the 2004 gay horror film Hellbent, which also featured songs by such notable queercore bands as Three Dollar Bill and Pansy Division.

Best Revenge was featured in the 2005 book Homocore:The Loud and Raucous Rise of Queer Punk by Ken Knox and David Ciminelli.

Discography

LPs and EPs

Compilation appearances

Band members 
The band experienced several lineup changes, first spurred by the departure of bassist KT just after the completion of the Starts With You full-length.
Lineup 1, 1998-December 2001:
Ryan Revenge, vocals and guitar
KT, bass and vocals
Bilito Peligro, drums and vocals

Lineup 2, January 2002-May 2002:
Ryan Revenge, vocals and guitar
Bilito Peligro, drums and vocals
Shug, bass and vocals

Lineup 3, May 2002-December 2002:
Ryan Revenge, vocals and guitar
Bilito Peligro, drums and vocals
Glen Livid, bass
Frisky McNicholl, second guitar and vocals

Lineup 4, final show December 6, 2002:
Ryan Revenge, vocals and guitar
Bilito Peligro, drums and vocals
KT, bass and vocals
Frisky McNicholl, second guitar and vocals

References

External links
Spitshine Records Site
Best Revenge Site
Feature from In LA magazine
Article in Phoenix New Times

Punk rock groups from California
Queercore groups